Karine Le Marchand (born Karine Mfayokurera, 16 August 1968 in Nancy), is a French television host.

Biography 
Le Marchand was born in Nancy to a French mother from Lorraine and a father from Burundi who left the home when she was one and a half years old. She lived growing up with her older sister Agnès, her mother, and her maternal grandmother.  It was not until much later, when TV5 Monde was filming a report in Burundi, that she got back in touch with her father, the former director of Burundi's national television. The reunion was disappointing. Her father died of AIDS two years later.

During her school studies, she played the harp and flute at the Regional Conservatory of Nancy with her sister Agnès. After her baccalaureate in French, she left her hometown in 1986 and moved to Paris. She enrolled in a Parisian high school while wishing to start a career as a singer. She started modeling, and started on the radio on RMC. She chose the pseudonym "Le Marchand" minutes before the start of her first live broadcast, under pressure from a Director, while she was presenting the Midi Pile show on France 3 Paris Île-de-France.

From France 3, where she hosted 1998 Music, whose editor-in-chief was Jean-Pierre Pasqualini, she briefly worked at M6 before joining TV5, where she stayed for nearly ten years.

References

External links 
http://media.rtl.fr/online/video/2016/0627/7783870194_gt-27-06-16-01.mp4

1968 births
Living people
French radio presenters
French women radio presenters
French television presenters
French women television presenters
Mass media people from Nancy, France
Knights of the Order of Agricultural Merit
French people of Burundian descent